"The Bitch Is Back" is a rock song written by English musician Elton John and songwriter Bernie Taupin, and performed by John. It was the second single released from John's 1974 album Caribou, and reached number 1 in Canada (his sixth in that country), number 4 in the United States and number 15 in the United Kingdom.

The lyrics parody John's celebrity lifestyle. In the US, it was certified Gold on 13 September 1995 by the Recording Industry Association of America.

Background
The idea to create the song was inspired not by John or Taupin directly, but rather by Taupin's wife at the time, Maxine Feibelman, who would say, "The bitch is back," when John was in a bad mood. Taupin then wrote the lyrics. Later, Elton would comment: "It is kind of my theme song." The song originally was written in A-flat major, but was later performed live a half step lower in the key of G major.

Reception
Cash Box said that "Elton and the band are in rare form here and prove that rock comes as easily as the ballads do" and that "the hooks are incredible, the vocals are intense and the playing is right there." Record World called it a "rambunctious rouser" that "doesn't mince words."

Controversy
Several radio stations in the United States and elsewhere refused to play the song because of the word "bitch". For example, in 1976, the program director of WPIX-FM in New York told Billboard, "We will play records that are borderline suggestive records such as 'Disco Lady' by Johnny [sic] Taylor but we will not play 'The Bitch Is Back' by Elton John. We won't play those types of records no matter how popular they get." John responded to the controversy, quipping "some radio stations in America are more puritanical than others."

Chart performance

Weekly charts

Year-end charts

Certifications

Covers
The song was twice recorded by Tina Turner, once for her Rough album in 1978, and again for the John/Taupin tribute album Two Rooms in 1991. Turner also performed the song in her live show in the late 1970s, and with John at the 1995 VH1 Fashion and Music Awards and VH1 Divas Live '99. For her rendition Turner earned a Grammy nomination for Best Female Rock Performance.

Rihanna covered the song with Elton at the third annual Fashion Rocks Concert in 2006.

"Feud", the sixteenth episode of Glees fourth season, uses "The Bitch Is Back" in a mash-up with Madonna's "Dress You Up", performed by Alex Newell and Blake Jenner.

Miley Cyrus covered the song for the 2018 cover album Restoration: Reimagining the Songs of Elton John and Bernie Taupin.

Taron Egerton covered the song for the 2019 Elton John biopic Rocketman. It was the first song featured in the film.

In Hocus Pocus 2 (2022), Bette Midler, Kathy Najimy and Sarah Jessica Parker perform the song in character as the Sanderson Sisters with the song rewritten as "The Witches Are Back".

Personnel

 Ray Cooper – tambourine
 Davey Johnstone – electric guitars
 Elton John – piano, vocals
 Clydie King – backing vocals
 Sherlie Matthews – backing vocals
 Dee Murray – bass, phased Pignose bass
 Nigel Olsson – drums
 Lenny Pickett – tenor sax (solo)
 Jessie Mae Smith – backing vocals
 Dusty Springfield – backing vocals
 Tower of Power horn section – brass

See also
 List of RPM number-one singles of 1974

References

External links
 

Elton John songs
Tina Turner songs
1974 singles
Songs with music by Elton John
Songs with lyrics by Bernie Taupin
Song recordings produced by Gus Dudgeon
1974 songs
RPM Top Singles number-one singles
DJM Records singles
Phonogram Records singles
MCA Records singles
The Rocket Record Company singles
British hard rock songs
Obscenity controversies in music